The 2021 Pan American Table Tennis Championships were held in Lima, Peru from 13 to 19 November 2021.

Medal summary

Events

Medal table

References

Pan American Table Tennis Championships
Pan American Table Tennis Championships
Pan American Table Tennis Championships
Sports competitions in Lima
International sports competitions hosted by Peru
Pan American Table Tennis Championships